Henry Thomson may refer to:

 Henry Thomson (painter) (1773–1843), English artist and Royal Academician
 Henry Thomson (Australian politician) (1872–1947), member of the Tasmanian House of Assembly
 Henry Thomson (Irish politician) (1840–1916), member of the House of Commons of the United Kingdom
 Henry Thomson (New Zealand politician) (1828–1903), mayor and Member of Parliament in Canterbury, New Zealand
 Henry Thomson (herald), Lord Lyon King of Arms from 1490
 Henry Broughton Thomson (1870–1939), merchant and politician in British Columbia, Canada
 Henry Thomson (footballer) (1906–1943), Australian rules footballer
 Henry Byerley Thomson (1822–1867), English barrister and jurist
 Henry Thomson (cricketer) (1854–1899), English cricketer
 Henry Alexis Thomson (1863–1924), Scottish anatomist and medical author

See also
 Henry Thompson (disambiguation)
 Harry Thomson (disambiguation)